Alingsås Municipality (Alingsås kommun) is a municipality in Västra Götaland County in western Sweden. Its seat is located in the city of Alingsås.

The present municipality was formed in 1974 then the former City of Alingsås (itself a municipality of unitary type since the subdivision reform of 1971) was amalgamated with Bjärke and Hemsjö.

Location, population
Alingsås is part (together with 12 other municipalities) of the Gothenburg Metropolitan Area with 900 000 inhabitants. As of 31 December 2019 Alingsås municipality had 41,420 inhabitants, most of which lived in Alingsås city (ca 25,000).

Politics
Result of the 2010 election:
 Moderate Party 27,90%	
 Centre Party 6,18%
 Liberal People's Party 9,99% 	
 Christian Democrats 8,74%	
 Swedish Social Democratic Party 25,72%	
 Left Party 6,16%
 Green Party 9,49%
 Sweden Democrats 4,75%
 Other Parties 1,06%

Sister cities
Alingsås has seven sister cities:
Leisi, Estonia
Karis, Finland
Kartong, Gambia
Mont-de-Marsan, France
Ocatal, Nicaragua
Skedsmo, Norway
Tårnby, Denmark

References

External links

Alingsås Municipality - Official site
 Articles Alingsås and Alingsås manufakturverk - From Nordisk familjebok

Municipalities of Västra Götaland County
Metropolitan Gothenburg
North Älvsborg